Battle of Kopychyntsi, (May 12, 1651) was a battle of the Khmelnytsky Uprising. Polish–Lithuanian Commonwealth forces under the command of Marcin Kalinowski defeated the Cossacks and Tatars forces under the command of Asand Demka.

References 

Conflicts in 1651
1651 in Europe
Kopychyntsi
History of Ternopil Oblast